The thirty-seventh series of the British medical drama television series Casualty began airing on BBC One in the United Kingdom on 20 August 2022. The series focuses on the professional and personal lives of medical and ancillary staff at the emergency department (ED) of the fictional Holby City Hospital. Jon Sen continues his role as the executive producer and Liza Mellody begins her position as series producer. Series 37 marks the return to regular filming protocols after the COVID-19 pandemic. The series has been marred by scheduling conflicts, with one episode premiering on BBC Two.

Following his appointment, Sen decided to alter the format of the show, removing the accidents that bring patients to the ED and instead having patients arrive injured. Starting in January 2023, he opted to split the series into 12 episode groups with a single story strand running through. The decision stems from a desire to adapt against other dramas and content available, as well as modernising the Casualty brand. The show's story team placed the pressures of working in the NHS at the focus of the series. A special improvised episode exploring the paramedic team was commissioned.

15 regular cast members reprised their roles from the previous series. Using these main characters, the issues of mental health, BRCA1, surrogacy and coercive control were explored, with some stories continuing from the previous series. Four of the show's main cast opted to leave their respective roles during the series, with one regular character killed-off. The opening episode of the series received a positive reception from television critics and NHS workers. The series has also received criticism; Sophie Dainty of Digital Spy opined that scheduling disruption had resulted in pacing issues and leaving the drama in "one of the most turbulent" periods.

Production 

The series commences in the United Kingdom on 20 August 2022 on BBC One, a week after the conclusion to the previous series. It is produced by BBC Studios. Jon Sen continues his role as executive producer, having been appointed late in the previous series. Loretta Preece served as the show's series producer until episode 2, with Liza Mellody taking over from episode 3. This series marks the first one to return to regular filming protocols, following two series of restricted filming techniques due to the COVID-19 pandemic. Episode durations also return to the full 50 minutes, having been reduced to 40 minutes during the previous two series. Filming for Casualty primarily takes place in a purpose-built studio at the BBC Roath Lock Studios in Cardiff, although the nature of the show means that filming also takes place on-location. On-location filming often occurs in Cardiff and other areas of southern Wales. On-location sites used for series 37 include Dyfrid Street, Barry Island and Adamsdown Square, Cardiff.

Scheduling 
Casualty normally airs weekly on BBC One on Saturday nights. The series has been marred by scheduling conflicts, which resulted in weeks without episodes and other weeks with double billings. In a piece on the future of the drama, Digital Spy Sophie Dainty opined that these scheduling disruptions were "contributing to a descent in quality and momentum". The first double billing of the series contained episodes 3 and 4, both broadcast on 3 September 2022. The coverage of the death of Elizabeth II meant that episode 5 premiered on BBC Two on 10 September 2022, rather than BBC One as initially planned. The show took a transmission break following the broadcast of episode 8 on 8 October 2022. Cast members William Beck and Elinor Lawless confirmed that the show would return to transmission in November 2022, and episode 9 will air on 19 November, six weeks after the last episode.

Promotion 
The series was promoted through a trailer released to the show's social media accounts. Calli Kitson from the Metro praised the trailer and called it "packed full of exciting storylines". She concluded, "Strap yourselves in! Watching the lives of hospital staff and patients unfold is never an easy ride..." The show's cast promoted the show during interviews with media outlets at the 2022 Inside Soap Awards. Sen gave an interview to the Metro Duncan Lindsay, where he promoted the show's future. The twelfth episode, which is an improvised special, was advertised through a trailer released on 7 December 2022. The episode's main cast and production team also promoted the episode through interviews. A trailer was released on 9 February 2023 to promote new episodes of the series.

Format 
Since its debut in 1986, Casualty has maintained a consistent format, which continues into this series. The format sees a minimum of one accident occur, which results in patients being admitted to Holby City Hospital's emergency department (ED), where they are treated by the show's regular characters. Alongside this, long-running story arcs took place across a series using the show's main cast. Following his appointment, Sen decided to alter the format of Casualty with changes taking place from January 2023. He removed the accident element of the show and instead had patients arrive at the hospital already injured. This move shifted focus to how patients were treated and their lives inside the hospital, rather than how they became injured. He said that he wanted to portray how the injury impacts a person's life. Sen was conscious that the audience may detach from the show if they are watching an inaccurate reflection of life.

Upon his appointment, Sen instilled five core values of "heart, wit, adrenaline, authenticity and entertainment" into the show's story team. He wanted to lead a focus on creating "Saturday night entertainment drama", drawing from the show's position in the schedule. In the show's new format, each series is split into "discrete mini-series" of 12 episodes. Each mini-series contains one main story arc running throughout with a handful of smaller stories "weaved in subtly". The first mini-series, running between episodes 13 and 25, follows Dylan working on an abuse case. The following mini-series, entitled "Welcome to the Warzone", follows four new "fresh-faced" nurses as they join the ED.

The decision to change the show's format stemmed from Sen wanting to adapt against "the level of competition from other channels and the proliferation of content". He did not want to exclude a fading audience to please long-term viewers and instead wanted to keep that audience through modernising the brand. He wanted to match other dramas in the way stories were told. Sen commented, "We may be a 37 year old brand but we aren’t predictable, boring, stale. We are exciting and modern." Sen wanted the new format to establish "serial drama in terms of hooks and long-term story". He felt this format allowed the audience to join into the series at any given point, rather than feeling they are unable to watch at all. Discussing the cast, Sen confirmed that the cast would remain consistent throughout the series and would not change regularly.

Story development 
Stories from the show's previous series were continued into this series as part of the characters' ongoing development. David Hide (Jason Durr) takes a focus as his mental health is explored following the death of his son, Oliver Hide (Harry Collett). Writers reintroduced his former wife, Rosalene Hide (Jackie Knowles), as part of the story. Rachel Bavidge also reprises her guest role as Susan Kellmer, a patient with Schizoaffective Disorder, during the story. Durr explained that David and Susan connect on a "deep, mental level" and she would help David with his own "mental anguish" when she returns. Paige Allcott's (Shalisha James-Davis) BRCA1 diagnosis story continues into this series. Likewise, a feud between consultant Stevie Nash (Elinor Lawless) and anaesthetist Jonty Buchanan (Richard Harrington) is revisited, now with intervention from management consultant Marcus Fidel (Adam Sina). 

A surrogacy storyline featuring Robyn Miller (Amanda Henderson), Marty Kirkby (Shaheen Jafargholi) and Adi Kapadia (Raj Bajaj) receives focus in the series. Through the story, Robyn's health is explored. Actor George Rainsford confirmed that his character Ethan Hardy would feature in a new story during the series, amid rumours circulating surrounding his exit. The opening episode leads a focus on the pressures of working in the NHS. Writers used the characters of Dylan Keogh (William Beck), Charlie Fairhead (Derek Thompson), Sah Brockner (Arin Smethurst) and Teddy Gowan (Milo Clarke) to highlight this. Through this focus, Sen wanted to reflect the everyday experiences of NHS staff in a "factual" manner rather than a "political" one. Actress Kirsty Mitchell told Alice Penwill of Inside Soap that her character Faith Cadogan's emotional state would be explored in this series, following a traumatic year. She also teased that the character would be given a love interest.

The topic of coercive control was explored in series 37 using the characters of Stevie and Marcus. The story begins when Stevie is attacked by a patient. Sen pointed out that this reflected the physical and verbal abuse NHS staff face daily. Lawless explained that the hospital is Stevie's "safe place" and the attack leaves her feeling "incredibly open, vulnerable, scared and childlike", the opposite of Stevie's characterisation. The attack pushes Stevie towards Marcus, who takes advantage of her vulnerability. Sen called the story "really fascinating to see", and Lawless opined that Stevie and Marcus' relationship is "definitely not what it seems".

At the Inside Soap Awards, Clarke revealed that the series would include a special episode exploring the paramedic team. He teased that it would "be fun and keep the audience on their toes". The actor later told Penwill (Inside Soap) that it was an improvised episode focusing on the "strain on the NHS", which he found "scary but fun". The episode is directed by Steve Hughes. Sen admitted to being worried about suggesting the episode to the cast, but was pleased when they were responsive and "threw themselves in with both feet". Discussing the creation of the episode, Sen told Duncan Lindsay from the Metro that the episode would be "the best way" to accurately reflect the pressure on the NHS, since queuing ambulances outside EDs was a "a real defining visual". The show's research team had found that ambulance waiting times were a rising issues for the general audience, which led producers to focus on this. For the special, actors were given themes to improvise from. Sen opined that there was "a real live quality" and "an intimacy that's really released from those scenes". The cast had not been required to improvise for their work "for a while" but adapted to the challenge. Additionally, the show's medical advisory team worked closely with the cast to help them with their portrayal.

Cast 
The thirty-seventh series of Casualty features a cast of characters working for the NHS within the emergency department of Holby City Hospital and the Holby Ambulance Service. Most cast members from the previous series reprise their roles in this series. William Beck appears as Dylan Keogh, the department's clinical lead and a consultant in emergency medicine. Di Botcher portrays Jan Jenning, the operational duty manager at Holby Ambulance Service. Milo Clarke stars as Teddy Gowan, a paramedic, and Jason Durr features as David Hide, the department's clinical nurse manager. Amanda Henderson and Shaheen Jafargholi both appear as staff nurses Robyn Miller and Marty Kirkby, respectively. Shalisha James-Davis plays Paige Allcott, an F1 doctor, and Elinor Lawless stars as consultant Stevie Nash. Kirsty Mitchell stars as Faith Cadogan, an advanced clinical practitioner (ACP), and Neet Mohan appears as Rash Masum, a clinical fellow. George Rainsford plays consultant Ethan Hardy, and both Arin Smethurst and Michael Stevenson feature as paramedics Sah Brockner and Iain Dean, respectively. Original cast member Derek Thompson appears as Charlie Fairhead, a senior charge nurse and emergency nurse practitioner. Charles Venn stars as Jacob Masters, a charge nurse. Additionally, four actors appear in a recurring capacity: Raj Bajaj (social worker Adi Kapadia), Stirling Gallacher (Ffion Morgan, a police officer), Paul Popplewell (receptionist Paul Pegg) and Adam Sina (management consultant Marcus Fidel).

Bajaj exited the series in episode 8 at the conclusion of his character's story. On 31 October 2022, Durr announced his departure from the show via his social media accounts. He had played David for six years. Speculation arose in August 2022 that Rainsford had left his role as Ethan after nine years, following a series of social media posts. Three months later, Rainsford confirmed his departure. His exit features in episode 16, and following its broadcast, he explained that he decided to leave to spend more time with his family and explore new projects. Sen expressed hope that both Durr and Rainsford would return at a later date. Scenes in episode 19 suggested an impending departure for Robyn (Henderson), as observed by Grace Morris of What to Watch and Hannah Bird of Digital Spy. However, the show did not comment on this. The character was then killed-off in episode 23, which had been embargoed until transmission. Having portrayed Robyn since 2013, Henderson was the longest-serving female character on the cast. The episode also featured the exits of David and Marty (Jafargholi). They both departed after Robyn's death, having become disilluisioned with the NHS. Jafargholi's departure had not been announced prior to transmission.

In September 2022, it was reported that Nigel Harman had begun filming a regular role on the show and would debut in 2023. He plays Max, who is billed as a "loveable rogue" who will "ruffle feathers" in some big stories for the show. Harman's casting was not officially confirmed until 7 February 2023. His character joins the ED as the new clinical lead and shares a backstory with Dylan. The role was created with Harman in mind; the actor found the decision to accept "easy" based on other actors' experiences on the serial. Max debuts in February.

The series features several recurring characters and multiple guest stars. Gordon Peaston and Alex Childs continue their guest role as Kevin Brockner and Jools Brockner, Sah's parents, in the series. Jackie Knowles reprises her role as Rosalene Hide, David's former wife, following a brief appearance in series 36. She appears in the second episode of the series. Having previously appeared in a series 34 episode, Rachel Bavidge returns as patient Susan Kellmer as part of David's story. Bavidge appears from episode two as a barista at the hospital café. Richard Harrington returns to his role as consultant anesthetist Jonty Buchanan in this series too.

On 28 October 2022, it was confirmed that actor Bob Barrett would reprise his role of Sacha Levy in series 37. He previously played Sacha in Casualty spinoff series Holby City until its cancellation in March 2022. Sen wanted to use the appearance of Sacha to attract the audience of Holby City. Sacha appears in episode 23 as part of Robyn's exit. Kriss Dosanjh and Shobu Kapoor reprised their recurring roles as Rash's father, Ashok Masum, and his partner, Mona Nadkarni. Appearing from episode 13, their story explores the topic of vascular dementia.

Main characters 
 William Beck as Dylan Keogh
 Di Botcher as Jan Jenning
 Milo Clarke as Teddy Gowan
 Jason Durr as David Hide
 Nigel Harman as Max Cristie
 Amanda Henderson as Robyn Miller
 Shaheen Jafargholi as Marty Kirkby
 Shalisha James-Davis as Paige Allcott
 Elinor Lawless as Stevie Nash
 Kirsty Mitchell as Faith Cadogan
 Neet Mohan as Rash Masum
 George Rainsford as Ethan Hardy
 Arin Smethurst as Sah Brockner
 Michael Stevenson as Iain Dean
 Derek Thompson as Charlie Fairhead
 Charles Venn as Jacob Masters

Recurring characters 
 Raj Bajaj as Adi Kapadia
 Kriss Dosanjh as Ashok Masum
 Stirling Gallacher as Ffion Morgan
 Paul Popplewell as Paul Pegg
 Adam Sina as Marcus Fidel

Guest characters 
Bob Barrett as Sacha Levy
 Rachel Bavidge as Susan Kellmer
 Alex Childs as Jools Brockner
 Richard Harrington as Jonty Buchanan
 Shobu Kapoor as Mona Nadkarni
 Jackie Knowles as Rosalene Hide
 Gordon Peaston as Kevin Brockner

Episodes

Reception 
Casualty won the 2022 Rose d'Or award in the Soap or Telenova category, after beating ten other international nominees. The show was also nominated for the Best Soap/Continuing Drama award at the 2023 Broadcast Awards.

Kitson of the Metro praised the series' opening episode and felt the focus on the NHS was "a very real, very powerful way to open a series". She opined that the audience had to "face hard truths in a very powerful and brutal way". In a feature for the publication, the opening episode was praised by Ed Hope, an ED doctor, and Joel Phillips, a paramedic. They both agreed that it reflected the current state of the NHS well, despite looking like a "dystopian fiction". Phillips also noted how the serial mirrored the NHS by highlighting "the impact relentless pressure is having on NHS employees". Kitson's colleague, Sue Haasler, called the opener "gritty". Television magazine What's on TV listed the opening episode in its television highlights of the week.

In a feature on Casualty future following the cancellation of sister show Holby City, Dainty from Digital Spy criticised the show, "We're not going to beat around the bush – Casualty is not what it used to be." She thought that 2022 (series 36 and 37) was "one of the most turbulent years in its 36-year history", which worried her. Dainty accredited the show's decline to scheduling disruption and "a palpable lack of publicity". She suggested that the BBC could utilise catch-up service BBC iPlayer to premiere episodes, in such a way that has been used for BBC soap opera EastEnders when they faced scheduling disruption. Examining the show's ratings, the reporter noted that viewing figures of series 37 were down approximately 400,000 viewers compared to series 36 episodes broadcast at the same time. In addition to a rating decline, she thought that storylines were facing "pacing problems" and a lack of "momentum", and named David's mental health story, Paige's BRCA story and the surrogacy plot as storylines which have suffered as a result. Despite her criticism, Dainty praised both Casualty and Holby City for being "ahead of the curve in terms of diverse casting and storylines". She believed that series 37 offered "great potential" by returning to the show's roots with a focus on the NHS.

References

Notes

External links 
  Casualty'' series 37 at BBC Online
 Casualty series 37 at the IMDb

2022 British television seasons
2023 British television seasons
37